Machine is an album by the American rock band Crack the Sky. The album was released on February 9, 2010. This is their fourteenth studio album.

Track listing

The band
John Palumbo (Vocals/Guitar/Keyboards)
Bobby Hird (Vocals/Guitar/Mandolin)
Joe Macre (Bass synthesizer/Electric bass)
Rick Witkowski (Vocals/Guitar)
Glenn Workman (Vocals/Keyboards)
Joey D'Amico (Vocals/Drums)
Anthony Rankin (Drums on track 9)

2010 albums
Crack the Sky albums